Værnes may refer to:

Places
Værnes, Trøndelag, an area in Stjørdal municipality in Trøndelag county, Norway
Trondheim Airport, Værnes, an international airport located at Værnes in Stjørdal municipality in Trøndelag county, Norway
Værnes Air Station, a Royal Norwegian Air Force station in Stjørdal municipality in Trøndelag county, Norway
Trondheim Airport Station, also called Værnes Station, a railwaystation 
Værnes Church, a church in the village of Prestmoen in Stjørdal municipality in Trøndelag county, Norway
Agdenes, a municipality in Trøndelag county that was known as Værnes from 1896 to 1897

People
Knut Værnes (born 1954), a Norwegian musician
Morten Værnes (born 1981), a Norwegian paralympic ice sledge hockey player

Norwegian-language surnames